The Force of Destiny is a 1950 Italian musical melodrama film directed by Carmine Gallone and starring Nelly Corradi, Tito Gobbi and Gino Sinimberghi. It is based on Giuseppe Verdi's opera La forza del destino.

The film's sets were designed by the art director Gastone Medin.

Cast

References

Bibliography
 . The Fabulous Thirties: Italian Cinema 1929–1944. Electa International, 1979.

External links

1950 films
1950s musical drama films
Italian musical drama films
1950s Italian-language films
Films directed by Carmine Gallone
Films based on operas by Giuseppe Verdi
Opera films
1950 drama films
Italian black-and-white films
1950s Italian films